Omiodes cuniculalis is a moth in the family Crambidae. It was described by Achille Guenée in 1854. It is found in French Guiana, Brazil, Costa Rica and Cuba.

The larvae have been recorded feeding on Gliricidia sepium.

References

Moths described in 1854
cuniculalis